Jonathan Edwards may refer to:

Musicians
Jonathan and Darlene Edwards, pseudonym of bandleader Paul Weston and his wife, singer Jo Stafford
Jonathan Edwards (musician) (born 1946), American musician
Jonathan Edwards (album), debut album of the musician
Jonathan Edwards, known as John Edwards, American R&B singer

Political figures
Jonathan Edwards (New York politician) (1798–1875), American lawyer and politician
Jonathan Edwards (Welsh politician) (born 1976), Member of Parliament since 2010

Religious figures
Jonathan Edwards (priest) (1615–1681), Archdeacon of Derry
Jonathan Edwards (academic) (1629–1712), theologian and Principal of Jesus College, Oxford 1686–1712
Jonathan Edwards (theologian) (1703–1758), American revivalist, preacher, theologian; president of Princeton University
Jonathan Edwards (the younger) (1745–1801), his son, American theologian

Sports figures
Jonathan Edwards (triple jumper) (born 1966), British triple jumper, world record holder and TV presenter
Jonathan Edwards (luger) (born 1972), American luger
Johnathan Edwards (born 1984), Welsh rugby union footballer
Jon Edwards (baseball) (born 1988), American Major League player
Jonathan Edwards (English footballer) (born 1996), English footballer

Others
Jonathan Edwards (Washington & Jefferson College) (1817–1891), first president of Washington & Jefferson College
Jonathan Edwards (numismatist) (1841–1886), American physician and numismatist
Jonathan Edwards (poet) (born 1979), Welsh poet

See also
Jonathan Edwards College, a residential college at Yale University, named after the elder theologian
John Edwards (disambiguation)